Naude is an Afrikaans surname, derived from the French Naudé. It may refer to:

 Johan Naude, a South African surgeon and urologist
 Alaric Naude, a linguist and professor

See also 
 Naudé

Afrikaans-language surnames
Surnames of French origin